Stanford Derere is a Zimbabwean sculptor.

Born in the village of Chapeyama, Derere grew up playing with clay, later going to art school to learn to draw.  From 1985 until 1986 he was a member of the BAT Workshop of the National Gallery of Zimbabwe.  There he learned painting and printmaking; he won an award from the gallery in 1988.  He later switched to sculpture, and has exhibited his work internationally; his sculptures are in the collection of the Chapungu Sculpture Park.

References
Biographical sketch

Year of birth missing (living people)
Living people
Zimbabwean sculptors